Viktoras Andriušis  (1908–1967) was a Lithuanian artist and designer.

He graduated from Kaunas Art School in 1931. From 1931 to 1944 he worked in the State Theater in Kaunas (1941-1944 in Kaunas Grand Theater) as a set designer andartist. He created the scenery for many drama, opera and ballet performances. In 1944 he moved to Germany, and in 1949 to the United States.

He died in 1967.

See also
List of Lithuanian painters

References

Lithuanian artists
1908 births
1967 deaths
Lithuanian emigrants to the United States